Broom is a hamlet near the village of Long Marton, in the Eden district, in the county of Cumbria, England.

Location 
It is located about two miles away from the small town of Appleby-in-Westmorland and about ten miles away from the large market town of Penrith.

Nearby villages 
Nearby villages include Brampton, Crackenthorpe, Long Marton and Dufton.

Transport 
For transport there is Appleby railway station (on the Settle-Carlisle Line), and the A66 road nearby.

External links 

 https://web.archive.org/web/20090803195259/http://www.bnbselect.com/bnb/31635
 http://www.thegardeningwebsite.co.uk/broom-horticultural-supplies-i1689.html

Hamlets in Cumbria
Long Marton